Eriothrix prolixa is a species of fly in the family Tachinidae.

Distribution
Austria, Bulgaria, Croatia, Czech Republic, Denmark, Finland, France, Germany, Greece, Hungary, Italy, Netherlands, Norway, Poland, Romania, Russia, Slovakia, Slovenia, Spain, Sweden, Switzerland, Ukraine and United Kingdom.

References

Diptera of Asia
Diptera of Europe
Taxa named by Johann Wilhelm Meigen
Dexiinae
Insects described in 1824